Krokskogen is a  forested area which located outside of Oslo, Norway. It is a part of Oslomarka and is situated between Bærumsmarka, Vestmarka and Nordmarka.

The wooded and hilly area of around 300 square kilometres is  bordered by Oslo and by the municipalities of Ringerike, Hole and Bærum. The highest points in the landscape are Oppkuven (704 m.), Ringkollen (702 m) and Gyrihaugen (682 m). The old road through Krokskogen which opened in 1805 was part of the King's Road (Ringeriksveien) from Oslo to Bergen.  It is now mostly used as a hiking and bridal  trail in season and for timber transport during the winter.

References

Other sources
Grimstad, Sverre  (2007) Krokskogen på kryss og tvers (topografisk forl)  

Forests and woodlands of Norway
Geography of Bærum
Geography of Oslo
Geography of Viken (county)